The 1999 Wealden District Council election took place on 6 May 1999 to elect members of Wealden District Council in East Sussex, England. The whole council was up for election and the Conservative Party stayed in overall control of the council.

Election result
Overall turnout at the election was 33.5%.

By-elections between 1999 and 2003

Heathfield

Uckfield (2 seats)
A by-election was held in Uckfield on 29 November 2001 for 2 seats on the council, following the 2 Liberal Democrat councillors, Mike and Gill Skinner, resigning from the council in September after moving from the county. The Conservatives gained both seats, with the wife of the chairman of the council, Silvia Buck, being one of the successful candidates.

Herstmonceux
A by-election was held in Herstmonceux on 4 April 2002 after the death of Conservative councillor Brian Jarman. Conservative Andrew Long held the seat for the party with a majority of 202.

Uckfield
A by-election was held in Uckfield on 27 June 2002 for one of the two seats that had been previously contested in a by-election in November 2001, as Conservative councillor Geoffrey Sampson resigned from the council in May 2002 after a controversial article on racism. The Liberal Democrats gained the seat back from the Conservatives.

References

1999 English local elections
1999
1990s in East Sussex